61st ACE Eddie Awards
February 19, 2011

Feature Film (Dramatic): 
The Social Network

Feature Film (Comedy or Musical): 
Alice in Wonderland

The 61st American Cinema Editors Eddie Awards, which were presented on Saturday, February 19, 2011 at the Beverly Hilton Hotel, honored the best editors in films and television.

Nominees were announced on January 14, 2011.

Winners and nominees
The winners are listed first and in bold.

Film
Best Edited Feature Film – Dramatic:

Angus Wall and Kirk Baxter - The Social Network
Andrew Weisblum - Black Swan
Pamela Martin - The Fighter
Lee Smith - Inception
Tariq Anwar - The King's Speech

Best Edited Feature Film – Comedy or Musical:

 Chris Lebenzon – Alice in Wonderland
Susan Littenberg – Easy A
Jeffrey M. Werner – The Kids Are All Right
Michael Parker – Made in Dagenham
Jonathan Amos & Paul Machliss – Scott Pilgrim vs. the World

Best Edited Animated Feature Film:

Ken Schretzmann & Lee Unkrich – Toy Story 3
Gregory Perler & Pam Ziegenhagen - Despicable Me
Maryann Brandon & Darren T. Holmes – How to Train Your Dragon

Best Edited Documentary Film:

Tom Fulford & Chris King – Exit Through the Gift Shop
Chad Beck & Adam Bolt – Inside Job
Jay Cassidy, Greg Finton & Kim Roberts - Waiting for "Superman"

Television
Best Edited Half-Hour Series for Television:

Jonathan Schwartz - Modern Family - "Family Portrait"
Brian A. Kates - The Big C - "Pilot"
Anne McCabe - Nurse Jackie - "Years of Service"

Best Edited One Hour Series for Commercial Television:

Hunter Via - The Walking Dead - "Days Gone Bye"

Kelley Dixon – Breaking Bad - "Sunset"
Mark Conte – Friday Night Lights - "I Can't"
Bradley Buecker, Doc Crotzer, Joe Leonard & John Roberts – Glee - "Journey"
Scott Vickrey – The Good Wife - "Running"

Best Edited One Hour Series for Non-Commercial Television:
Sidney Wolinsky - Boardwalk Empire - "Pilot"
Louis Cioffi – Dexter - "Take It"
Kate Sanford & Alexander Hall – Treme - "Do You Know What it Means"

Best Edited Mini-Series or Motion Picture for Television:

Leo Trombetta – Temple Grandin
Marta Evry & Alan Cody – The Pacific - "Okinawa"
Aaron Yanes – You Don’t Know Jack

Best Edited Reality Series:

Rob Goubeaux, Mark S. Andrew, Paul Coyne, Jeremy Gantz, Heather Miglin, Hilary Scratch, John Skaare & Ken Yankee - If You Really Knew Me - "Colusa High"

Kelly Coskran & Josh Earl – The Deadliest Catch - "Redemption Day"
Yvette Mangassarian-Amirian, Eric Myerson, Michael Caballero, David Michael Maurer & Edward Salier - Whale Wars 3 - "Vendetta"

Student Film Awards
Andrew Hellesen - Chapman University
Adam Blum - Chapman University
Michael Hyde - American University

Honorary Awards
Christopher Nolan - Golden Eddie Award

References

External links
ACE Award 2011 at the Internet Movie Database

61
2011 film awards
2011 guild awards
2011 in American cinema